Amadeu Fernandes da Silva Sobrinho, or simply Amadeu (born 6 March 1990), is a Brazilian born Azerbaijani futsal player who plays for Nacional Zagreb and the Azerbaijan national futsal team.

References

External links
UEFA profile

1990 births
Living people
Sportspeople from Recife
Azerbaijani men's futsal players
Araz Naxçivan players